The London Convention was a treaty negotiated in 1884 between Great Britain, as the paramount power in South Africa, and the South African Republic. The London Convention superseded the 1881 Pretoria Convention.

Historical background
The treaty governed the relations between the ZAR and Britain following the retrocession of the South African Republic in the aftermath of the First Boer War.

Delegates 
The South African Republic was represented by the following delegates:

 President Paul Kruger
 General Nicolaas Smit
 Rev. Stephanus Jacobus du Toit
 Jonkheer Gerard Jacob Theodoor Beelaerts van Blokland, a Dutch legal advisor to the South African Republic
 Ewald Auguste Esselen, as secretary to the Boer delegation

Content of the convention
The convention incorporated the bulk of the earlier Pretoria Convention, but with two major differences.

Name of the country
Following the Pretoria Convention, the name of the South African Republic had been changed to the Transvaal Territory. At the request of the Transvaal Territory's Volksraad the name was restored to the South African Republic.

Suzerainty
The main outcome of the London Convention was that British suzerainty over the South African Republic was amended. The London convention stipulated that the South African Republic had the right to enter into a treaty with the Orange Free State without approval from the British.  Any other treaty with any other nation would require approval from the British subject to the British not taking longer than six months to advise the South African Republic of such an approval or rejection.

See also
 South African Republic
 History of South Africa

References

1884 in the United Kingdom
Treaties of the United Kingdom (1801–1922)
Treaties concluded in 1884
Treaties of the South African Republic
South Africa–United Kingdom relations